After Dark is a three-issue, dark science fiction limited series published by Radical Comics in a 56-page graphic novella format. The series concept and characters were created by film director/writer Antoine Fuqua (director of Training Day) and actor Wesley Snipes (star of the Blade series). The series is written by Peter Milligan (best known for Marvel Comics's X-Statix series) and illustrated by Jeff Nentrup.

On June 30, 2010, a "#0" issue was released as a prequel. The official start of the main series is August 2010.

Publication history
The first book is due to be released in August and the second in October.

Plot synopsis 
The series is set in a post-apocalyptic near-future in which the Earth exists in a state of near-perpetual darkness. Civilization has largely become confined to domed cities in which the populace exists in a state of drug-addled stupor in order to while away time between birth and death.

The rulers of Solar City, the most populated of humanity's remaining bastions, enlist a Bedouin drifter, named simply Omar, to lead a team into the wilds outside of the city in search of the savior they believe may exist somewhere in the sparsely populated wilds.

Notes

References 

 

2010 graphic novels
American graphic novels
Comics by Peter Milligan
Works by Antoine Fuqua